Nicholls Town is a town located in North Andros, part of Andros island in the Bahamas. The town features a sweeping beachfront.

It is named for Edward Nicolls, an Anglo-Irish military leader in the Caribbean in the early 19th century. He was an active abolitionist and because of him many former slaves were able to escape from the U.S. The founders of Nicholls Town were ex-slave refugees from the United States.

The Andros Island Beach Resort is located in Nicolls Town. The town is the centre for diving and snorkelling in North Andros.

It has a population of 645 (2010 Census). The village is served by San Andros Airport.

See also
 Districts of the Bahamas
 Islands of the Bahamas
 List of cities in the Bahamas

References

External links

Populated places in the Bahamas
Andros, Bahamas
Fugitive American slaves